Avadhoot Gupte (Marathi pronunciation: [əʋəd̪ʱuːt̪ ɡupt̪e]; born 19 February 1977) is an Indian singer, musician, writer, music & film director, film producer, television presenter and actor who works primarily in Marathi Cinema. He started his career as a film director with Zenda in 2010.

Career 

Gupte's career as a singer started when he won the national level competition of TVS - Sa Re Ga Ma in the year 1996. Since then he has lent his voice to various varieties of songs from Lok Sangit to Rock style songs in Marathi and film songs for both Marathi & Hindi movies.

Gupte has also performed numerous live shows. His ability as a performer has been applauded by audiences worldwide. He creates the rapport with the audience within a very short span of time whenever he steps on the stage.

His latest album Dil Se Maratha Hai became a run away hit with the Super hit track Jai Jai Maharashtra. His versatility as a singer is amply evident, when he renders fun and foot tapping numbers like Meri Madhubala and Halu Halu Chaal with equal ease as serious numbers like Salam-E-Ishq (Remix) and Din Pareshan. In Jai Jai Maharashtra he does justice to the track by rendering the song with a rock feel.

Thus, as a singer Gupte has the capacity to mold his voice to the requirement and mood of the composition and lyrics or track as the case may be.

Controversies 

Gupte moved to production and direction of feature films. His first venture was a 2010 Marathi film, Zenda, which created controversy. Zenda depicted a feud between two cousins in rival political parties, inspired by the real-life feud between Raj Thackeray, chief of Maharashtra Navnirman Sena (MNS) and his cousin, Uddhav Thackeray, executive president of Shiv Sena. Gupte believes that it is more about the Marathi youth and the volunteers working in political parties, with just a couple of characters in the film representing Thackerays and that the film is "serious and not a political satire". Before the final release in public, the film was shown to the Thackerays and had received a green signal from them. The film was released in January 2010 in theatres across Maharashtra state. The release was delayed for protests against the film by "Swabhiman Organisation" headed by Nitesh Rane. Rane opposed a character in the film that resembled his father Narayan Rane, the ex-Chief Minister of Maharashtra and the then Minister of Revenue for the state.

Awards

Filmography

Feature films

Television

Music videos

Playback singing

Feature films

Album

References

External links

 
 

Living people
Indian male singers
Sa Re Ga Ma Pa participants
Marathi-language singers
Marathi music
Marathi playback singers
1977 births
Television judges
Marathi film directors